Attorney General Bennett may refer to:

John J. Bennett Jr. (1894–1967), Attorney General of New York
Mark J. Bennett (born 1953), Attorney General of Hawaii

See also
General Bennett (disambiguation)